Innocent Victim is the 11th studio album by British hard rock band Uriah Heep, released in November 1977 by Bronze Records in the UK and Warner Bros. Records in the US.

Although it did not chart in the US or UK, Innocent Victim went on to sell more than 100,000 copies in Germany alone, and reached No. 19 and No. 44 in New Zealand and Australia, respectively. The single "Free Me" was a #3 hit in New Zealand and also peaked at #3 in South Africa. "Free Me" was also Uriah Heep's only hit in Australia, reaching #9.

The eyes of drummer Lee Kerslake were used for the snake on the cover artwork. In the US, the sleeve was a live photomontage instead.

The album was remastered and reissued by Castle Communications in 1997 with two bonus tracks, and again in 2004 in an expanded deluxe edition including three live tracks recorded during the band's 1979 European tour (these are alternate versions to the ones released on the Live in Europe 1979 album).

Track listing

Personnel
Uriah Heep
 Mick Box – guitars
 Ken Hensley – keyboards, guitars, backing vocals, producer
 Lee Kerslake – drums, backing vocals
 Trevor Bolder – bass
 John Lawton – vocals

Production
 Gerry Bron – producer
 Peter Gallen – engineer
 Mark Dearnley – engineer on track 9
 John Gallen, Juilan Cooper – assistant engineers

Charts

Album

Weekly charts

Year-end charts

Singles

Certifications

References

External links 
 

1977 albums
Uriah Heep (band) albums
Albums produced by Gerry Bron
Bronze Records albums
Warner Records albums